Rotary friction welding (RFW) one of the methods of friction welding, the classic way of which uses the work of friction to create a not separable weld. Typically one welded element is rotated to the other and forge (pressed down by axial force). The heating of the material is caused by friction work and creates a permanent connection. In this method can be welded the same, dissimilar, or composite and non-metallic materials. The friction welding methods of are often considered as solid-state welding.

History 

Some applications and patents connected with friction welding were dated back to the turn of the 20th century, and rotary friction welding is the oldest of these methods. W. Richter patented the method of linear friction welding (LFW) process in 1924 in England and 1929 in Germany; however, the description of the process was vague and H.Klopstock patented the same process in the USSR 1924. But first description and experiments related to rotary friction welding took place in the Soviet Union in 1956, machinist named A. J. Chdikov (А. И. Чудиков) has realized scientific studies and suggested the use of this welding method as a commercial process at first he discovered the method by accident in Elbrussky mine where he worked, he did not pay enough attention and not lubricate the lathe chuck inside and then it turned out that he had welded the workpiece to the lathe. He wondered if this accident can be used for joining and came to conclusion that it was necessary to work at high rotation speeds (in these times about 1000 turnover per second), immediately brake and press down welded components. He decided to write a letter to the Ministry of Metallurgy and received the answer that this welding was inappropriate, but small note about the method was published in the newspaper and aroused interest with Yu. Ya. Terentyeva  who was manager in Scientific Research Institute of Electrical Welding Equipment, and with time his method was disseminated. The process was introduced to the USA in 1960. The American companies Caterpillar Tractor Company (Caterpillar - CAT), Rockwell International, and American Manufacturing Foundry all developed machines for this process. Patents were also issued throughout Europe and the former Soviet Union. The first studies of friction welding in England were carried out by the Welding Institute in 1961. The US with Caterpillar Tractor Company  and MTI developed an inertia process in 1962. Europe with KUKA AG and Thompson launches rotary friction welding for industrial applications in 1966, developed a direct-drive process and in 1974 builds rRS6 the double spindle machine for heavy truck axles. In 1997, international patent application was filed entitled "Method of Friction Welding Tubular Members", A. Graham was presented welding pipes with a diameter of 152.4 mm a method that uses radial friction welding with an intermediate ring for connect long pipes, but some attempts occurred earlier in 1975 through methods called radial friction welding (RF), and even earlier, for example specialists from Leningrad mention about possibility of use ring to connect long components and it was written before the 1960s in newspaper. Another method was invented and experimentally proven at The Welding Institute (TWI) in the UK and patented in 1991 Friction stir welding (FSW) process. In 2008 KUKA AG developed the rotary friction welding machine SRS 1000 with a forged force of 1000 tons. An improved modification is also Low Force Friction Welding, hybrid technology developed by EWI and Manufacturing Technology Inc. (MTI), the process can apply to both linear and rotary friction welding. Based on information from 2020 year only KUKA has been operating in 44 country and has initiated more than 1200 systems also for subcontract facility however there are more companies in the world and for example The Welding Institute TWI have more than 50 years expertise and insight inherent to process development. However, there are more companies not every is promoted but today, friction welding is conducted worldwide with various materials both in scientific studies and industrial applications.

Applications 
Rotary friction welding is widely implemented across the manufacturing sector and has been used for numerous applications, including:

 Parts in gas turbine such as: turbine shafts, turbine discs, compressor drums,
Automotive parts including steel truck axles and casings, hollow valve, motor hollow pistons, passenger car wheel rims, converter for passenger car automatic gears, 
Turbine for aircraft engine,
 Monel to steel marine fittings,
 Piston rods,
 Copper - aluminium electrical connections,
Heat exchangers,
 Cutting tools,
Drill pipes,
Reactor pressure vassels nozzles,
Tubular transition joints combining dissimilar metals (Aluminium - Titanium and Aluminium - Stainless steel),
Potential for medical applications,
For learning students at technical universities.

Connections geometry 
Rotary Friction Welding can join a wide range of part geometries Typically: 
Tube to Tube, Tube to Plate, Tube to Bar, Tube to Disk, Bar to Bar, Bar to Plate and in addition, to this a rotating ring is used to connect long components.Geometry of the component surface not is not always flat for example it can be conical surface and not only.

Types of materials to be welded 

In rotary friction welding enables to weld various materials. Metallic materials of the same name or dissimilar either composite, superalloys and non-metallic e.g. thermoplastic polymers can be welded and even welding of wood is investigated, however welding a wood is not a good idea. Weldability tables of metallic alloy can be found on the Internet and in books. Sometimes an interlayer is used to connect non-compatible materials.

Rotary friction welding for plastics 

Friction welding is also used to join thermoplastic components.

Division due to drive motor 
In direct-drive friction welding (also called continuous drive friction welding) the drive motor and chuck are connected. The drive motor is continually driving the chuck during the heating stages. Usually, a clutch is used to disconnect the drive motor from the chuck, and a brake is then used to stop the chuck.

In inertia friction welding the drive motor is disengaged, and the workpieces are forced together by a friction welding force. The kinetic energy stored in the rotating flywheel is dissipated as heat at the weld interface as the flywheel speed decreases. Before welding, one of the workpieces is attached to the rotary chuck along with a flywheel of a given weight. The piece is then spun up to a high rate of rotation to store the required energy in the flywheel. Once spinning at the proper speed, the motor is removed and the pieces forced together under pressure. The force is kept on the pieces after the spinning stops to allow the weld to "set".

Stages of process 

Step 1 and 2, friction stage: one of the component is set in rotation, and then pressed to the other stationary one in axial of rotation,
 Step 3, braking stage: the rotating component is stopped in braking time,
 Step 4, upsetting stage: the welded elements are still forging by forge pressure (pressed down),
Step 5: in standard RFW welding (standard parameters), a flash will be created. Flash can be cut off on the welder.
However, referring to the stages chart:

 modifications of the process exist,
may depend on the version of the process: direct-drive, inertia friction welding, hybryd welding,
 there are many versions of welding machines,
 many materials can are welded with not the same properties, with various geometries,
 the real life process does not have to match to the ideal settings on the welding machine.

RFW Friction work on cylindrical rods workpieces 
Friction work create weld and can believe that is calculated for cylindrical workpieces from math:

Work:

(1) 

Moment of force M general formula:

(2) 

The force F will be the frictional force T (F=T) so substituting for the formula (2):

(3) 

The friction force T will be the pressure F times by the friction coefficient μ:

(4) 

So moment of force M:

(5) 

The alpha angle that each point will move with the axis of rotating cylindrical workpieces will be:

(6) 

So friction work:

(7)  [verification needed]

For variable value μ over friction time:

(8) 

This requires verification but from equation it appears that turnover and force (or pressure no surface ) is linear to friction work (W) so for example if pressure increase 2 times then friction work also increase 2 times, if turnover increase 2 times then friction work also increase 2 times and referring to rules conservation of energy this can heat 2 times more the material to the same temperature or the temperature may increase 2 times. However pressure has the same effect over the entire surface but rotation have more impact away from the axis of rotation because it is a rotary motion. Referring to thermal conductivity the friction time affects to the flash size when shorter time was used then friction work is more concentrated in a smaller area.

or variable values μ, n, F over friction time:

(9) 

 t [s]- time of friction (when piece rotary),
μ - coefficient of friction,
 F [N]- pressure force,
 r [m]- radius of workpiece,
 n [1/s] - turnover per second,
 W [J] - friction work.

Therefore, the calculation in this way is not reliable in real is complicated. An example article considering the variable depends on the temperature coefficient of friction steel - aluminum Al60611 - Alumina is described by authors from Malaysia in for example this paper "Evaluation of Properties and FEM Model of the Friction Welded Mild Steel-Al6061-Alumina" and based on this position someone created no step by step but whatever an instructional simulation video in abaqus software and in this paper is possible to find the selection of the mesh type in the simulation described by the authors and there are some instructions such as use the Johnson-Cook material model choice, and not only, there is dissipation coefficient value, friction welding condition, the article included too the physical formulas related to rotary friction welding described by the authors such as: heat transfer equation and convection in rods, equations related to deformation processes. Article included information on the parameters of authors research, but it is not a step by step and simple instruction such as also the video and good add that it is not the only one position in literature. The conclusion include information that: "Even though the FE model proposed in this study cannot replace a more accurate analysis, it does provide guidance in weld parameter development and enhances understanding of the friction welding process, thus reducing costly and time consuming experimental approaches."

The coefficient of friction changes with temperature and there are a number of factors internal friction (viscosity - e.g. Dynamic viscosity according to Carreau's fluid law), forge, properties of the material during welding are variable, also there is plastic deformation.

Carreau's fluid law:

Generalized Newtonian fluid where viscosity, depends upon the shear rate, by the following equation:

(10) 

Where:

  = viscosity at zero shear rate (Pa.s)
  = viscosity at infinite shear rate (Pa.s)
  = relaxation time (s)
  = power index
Modelling of the frictional heat generated within the RFW process can be realized as a function of conducted frictional work and its dissipation coefficient, incremental frictional work of a node 𝑖 on the contacting surface can be described as a function of its axial distance from the rotation centre, current frictional shear stress, rotational speed and incremental time. The dissipation coefficient 𝛽FR is often set to 0.9 meaning that 90% of frictional work is dissipated into heat.

(11) 𝑑𝑞FR(𝑖) = 𝛽FR ∙ 𝑑𝑊FR(𝑖) = 𝛽FR ∙ 𝜏𝑅(𝑖) ∙ 𝜔 ∙ 𝑟𝑖 ∙ 𝑑𝑡 on contacting surface of node 𝑖

𝛽FR - dissipation coefficient,
 𝑊FR - frictional work,
 𝑟𝑖 - distance from the rotation centre,
 dt - time increment,
 𝜏𝑅(𝑖) - current frictional shear stress,
 𝜔 - rotational speed.

Friction work can also calculate from power of used for welding and friction time (will not be greater than the friction time multiply to the power of the welder - engine of the welder) referring to rules conservation of energy. This calculation looks the simplest.

(12) E = Pxt or for not constant power  

 E - energy,
 P - power,
 t - power runtime.

However, in this case, energy can be also stored in the flywheel if is used depending on the welder construction.

General flywheel energy formula:

(13) 

where:

  is the stored kinetic energy,
 ω is the angular velocity, and
  is the moment of inertia of the flywheel about its axis of symmetry.
Sample calculations not by computer simulation also exist in the literature for example related to power input and temperature distribution can be found in the script from 1974:

K. K. Wang and Wen Lin from Cornell University in "Flywheel friction welding research" manually calculates welding process and even at this time the weld structure was analysed.

However, generally: The calculations can be complicated.

Weld Zone Descriprion

Weld photo gallery

Heat and mechanical affected zones 
Friction work is converted into rise of temperature in the welding zone area, and as a result of this the weld structure is changed. In typical rotary friction welding process rise of temperature at the beginning of process should be more extensively away from the axis of rotation because points away axis have greater linear velocity and in time of weld the temperature disperses according to thermal conductivity welded parts.

"Technically the WCZ and the TMAZ are both "thermo-mechanically affected zones" but due to the vastly different microstructures they possess they are often considered separately. The WCZ experiences significant dynamic recrystallisation (DRX), the TMAZ does not. The material in HAZ is not deformed mechanically but is affected by the heat. The region from one TMAZ/HAZ boundary to the other is often referred to as the "TMAZ thickness" or the plastically affected zone (PAZ). For the remainder of this article this region will be referred to as the PAZ."

Zones:

 WCZ– weld center zone,
 HAZ – heat affected zone,
 TMAZ – Thermo-Mechanically Affected Zone,
 BM – base material, parent material,
 Flash.
Furthermore, in the literature, there is also a subdivided according to the type of grain.

Similar terms exist in welding.

During typical welding initially, the outer region heats up more, due to the higher linear velocity. 

Next, the heat spreads, and the material is pushed outside, thus creating a flash which can be cut off on the welding machine.

Heat flow, heat flux in rods 

It can create a hypothesis that heat flows in welding time like in a cylindrical rod it makes possible to suppose to calculate a temperature in individual places and times from the knowing of the issues of heat flow and heat flux in rods for example, temperature can be read by using thermocouples and compare with computer simulation.

Weld measuring system 
To provide knowledge about the process, monitoring systems are often used and this are carried out in several ways which affects the accuracy and the list of measured parameters.

The list of measured and calculated parameters can looks like this:

 axial force and pressure,
 angular - rotation speed,
 spindle centre,
 velocity,
 vibration,
 length (burn off rate),
 temperature.

Temperature measuring systems 
Examples of weld measurements. In the literature, can be found measurements of the thermal weld area with thermocouples and not only the non-contact thermographic method is also used.

However, it also depends on the specific case for a very small area of the weld and HAZ there are cans by difficulties in thermal measuring in real time it can be calculated later after friction time there is heat flow.
Sample source code for temperature measurement made on arduino, this is far away from the topic, however there are missing full open friction welding codes. Exists the free open source software for simulation (List of finite element software) but there is no welding open codes and detailed instructions to this software.

Research, temperature, parameters in the rotary friction welding process 

Quality requirements of welded joints depend on the form of application, e.g. in the space or fly industry weld errors are not allowed. Science try to gets good quality welds, also some people have been interested in many years in welding knowledge, so there are many scientific articles describing the methods of joining. They are performed weld tests which give knowledge about mechanical properties of material in welded zone e.g. hardness tests, and tensile tests are performed. Based on the tensile tests the stretch curve are created which can give directly knowledge about ultimate tensile strength, breaking strength, maximum elongation and reduction in area and from these measurements the Young's modulus, Poisson's ratio, yield strength, and strain-hardening characteristics is created.

Where, the articles often contain only data related to tensile tests such as:

 Yield Strength in MPa
 Ultimate Tensile Strength in MPa
 Elongation in % percentage

Where the units of SI are: K, kg, N, m, s and then Pa and this knowledge about this is needed for introducing data, material properties and not do errors in simulation programs.

Research articles also often contain information about:

 chemical composition of connected components

and inclusion process parameters is obvious such as:

 Friction Pressure (MPa)
 Friction Time (s)
 Welding Speed (rpm)
 Upset Pressure (MPa)
 Upset Time (s)
Is also possible to find descriptions in research literature about: mechanical properties, microstructure, corrosion and wear resistance, and even cytotoxicity welded material.

There are several methods to determine the quality of a weld and for example the weld microstructure is examined by optical microscopy and scanning electron microscopy.

The computer finite element method (FEM) is used to predict the shape of the flash and interface, not only for rotary friction welding (RFW), but also for friction stir welding (FSW), linear friction welding (LFW), FRIEX.

In addition to the weld testing, the weld head affected zones are described. Knowledge of the maximum temperatures in the welding process make it possible to define the area structural changes. Process are analisis e.g. temperature measurements are also carried out for scientific purposes research materials, journals, by use contact thermocouples or sometimes no contact thermography methods. For example, an ultra fine grain structure of alloy or metal which is obtained by techniques such as severe plastic deformation or Powder metallurgy is desirable, and not changed by the high temperature, a large heat affected zone is unnecessary. Temperature may reduce material properties because dynamic recrystallization will occur, there maybe changes in grain size and phase transformations structures of welded materials. In steel between austenite, ferrite, pearlite, bainite, cementite, martensite.

Various parameters of welding are tested. The setting of the completely different parameters can obtain different weld for example the structure changes will not be the same width. It is possible to obtain a smaller heat-affected zone (HAZ) and a plastically affected zone (PAZ). The width of the weld is smaller. The results are for example not the same in welds made for the European Space Agency with a high turnover ω = 14000 rpm or another example from Warsaw technical university 12000 rpm and no typical very short friction time only 60 milliseconds instead of using an standard parameters, in addition, in this case, ultra fine grain alloy was welded, but for this example the welded rod workpiece was only 6mm in diameter so it is small rod friction welding another close to this examples with short friction time only e.g. 40 ms also exist in literature but also for small diameter. The rotations in the research literature for small diameters can be more as standard even e.g. 25000 rpm. Unfortunately the diameter of the workpiece can be a limitation to the use of high speeds of rotation.

The key points to understand is that: Fine grain of the welded metal material according to Hall-Petch relation should have better strength and for the description of one technique for obtaining this material Percy Williams Bridgman won the Nobel Prize in Physics in 1946 referring to the achievements related to High Pressure Torsion (HPT),. However, by High Pressure Torsion is obtained only thin film thickness material.

There is also research into the introduction of interlayers. Even though dissimilar material joining is often more difﬁcult the introduction for example nickel interlayer by an experimental electrodeposition deposition technique to increase the connection quality has been investigated by the Indian Institute of Metals, however in this case nickel interlayer thickness was of 70 m (micrometre ) and only small rods of 12mm diameter were welded.

Some scientists describe material research. Group of known materials is large includes: Ni nickel based superalloys such as Inconel, ultra-fine grain materials such as ultra-fine grain aluminum, low carbon steel e.g. Ultra Low Carbon Bainitic Steel (ULCBS). Friction welding is used for connection many materials including superalloys for example nickel-based Inconel, scientists describe connecting various materials and on the internet is possible finding articles about this and same part of the research relates to joining superalloys materials or materials with improved properties. Nickel based superalloys exhibit excellent high temperature strength, high temperature corrosion and oxidation resistance and creep resistance. However, referring to this research good add that nickel is not the most common and cheapest material: Prices list of chemical elements.

Parameters 
 Turnover: Typically turnover is selected depending on the type of material and dimensions of welded parts have different values:  400 - 1450 rpm, sometimes max 10000 rpm. Not typically, in research literature turnover is to 25000 rmp.
 Friction time: typically 1 - to a several dozen seconds. Not typically, in research literature friction time can be in tends of milliseconds, however when time is very short and parameters are not typical process can require a lot of preliminary preparation and testing to the positive result. 
Forge time: Up to a few seconds.
However, the parameters will be different as elements of different sizes can be welded. For example, can be produced ranging from the smallest component with a diameter of 3 mm to turbine components with a diameter in excess of 400 mm.

By combining methods of connecting long elementss perhaps future science may study the friction welding of rails for example for the high speeds railway industry and use the preheat Low force linear friction welding or modified Linear friction welding (LFW) method and vibrating insert (just like the rotating insert in FRIEX method) for do this if the machine are developed and also good add that most of attention are directed to safety of travelers, user safety should be preserved at the first place.

Preliminary research involving similar welds and geometry has shown improved tensile strength and increased performance in the fatigue tests.

Controversies in research 

 As of August 2022, there are no step-by-step reviewed instructions on how to simulate the temperature of weldet components. There are no shared source files for programs where simulation of welding is possible. On the other hand, some of the knowledge is difficult for example in 08.2022 an article: Hamed, Maien Mohamed Osman the "Numerical simulation of friction welding processes: An arbitrary Lagrangian-Eulerian approach" was shared on google scholar but it is difficult to understand.
 Problem with open article reviews or revies no exist.
 Correct use of grants, and repeating of knowledge for example the structure of a lot of articles is similar and sometimes generally only the next material is welded so there is nothing new but some of research is granted.
 It is only friction welding, generally nothing difficult, on the other hand there are many complicated descriptions, but the practical result of this articles is missing: The expectation is to create something new, unknown so far.
 Correct use of grants, time of articles, who is first, announcing about the desire to create something new an innovative device by the university but this is not done:
 Poland

Google scholar finds 246 articles in response to the "friction welding" phrase in 8.2022, this is only part of all available research, and for some of them financial grants are given. However, for example in 2016 The Institute of Electronic Materials Technology in Poland  published the article in Polish language about welding Al/Al2O3 Composites, after then two years later the Warsaw University of Technology publishes an article in Polish language about friction welding ultrafine grained 316L steel in 2018, although the materials was different, but the process parameters suggest that the welding machine is the same, so in this case The Institute of Electronic Materials Technology was published the data first, and summarizing in this case: in 2018 only the new material, which was steel, was welded and tested, the machine was not new but for this a grant was obtained (843 920 PLN = ~$177476 USD). It has not been written into the articles since the two institutes had a machine and since studies with short friction times were carried out. 
Students were informed about the willingness to create by the university a new innovative friction welder, but to 08.2022 there is no information about this, there are new research articles, but the device is still old.

Low Force Friction Welding 

A improved modification of the standard friction welding is Low Force Friction Welding, hybrid technology developed by EWI and Manufacturing Technology Inc. (MTI), "uses an external energy source to raise the interface temperature of the two parts being joined, thereby reducing the process forces required to make a solid-state weld compared to traditional friction welding". The process applies to both linear and rotary friction welding.

Low force friction advantages:

 Little or no flash,
 Joining of components previously limited by friction welding,
 Reduced machine footprint,
 Reduced weld cycle time,
 Higher orientation precision,
 Part repeatability.
Following the informations from the Manufacturing Technology blog and website, the technology is promising.

However, in 2021 the number of scientific articles for example on Google Scholar about Low force friction is smaller compared to description of the standard method about friction welding where an external energy source to raise the interface temperature is not used.

Construction of the welding machine 

Depending on the construction, but a standard welding machine may include the following systems:

 Control system
 Motor or motors in e.g. direct-drive welder
 Pneumatic or hydraulic pressure system
 Handle
 Non rotating vice
 Clutch in direct-drive friction welder
 Spindle
 Flywheel in inertia friction welder
 Housing
 Measuring systems
Producers present solutions and welding machines can include:

 Measurement and control dimensional systems: Active Travel Control, burn off rate measurement,
 Automation solutions, Defined angle positioning, Component lifter, Automatic door operations, Weld data export, Ready for industrial solutions, Automatic temperature control of the headstock, Monitoring of the cooling unit, servo motor control, 
 Have solutions for clean environment with no arcs, sparks, smoke or flames,
Have ergonomic workspace, nice design,
No special foundations or power supplies are required,
 Process control and documentation systems: All process data is documented numerically and graphically, have program management, Calculated parameters - Smart machine
 HMI touchscreen panels,
 Flash cut off device systems on the welder, flash removal and facing, chip conveyor,
 Completely integrated solution in the specific production workflow using state of the art 3D process simulation,
 Service assistance: Remote Service, Alarm conditions,
 Have certificates,
Advanced Measurement systems,
 Ready for robot automation for handling components.
Include innovative solutions: for example hybrid technology Low Force Friction Welding, and the system associated with this technology,
However, there is not one manufacturer on the market and no one welder machine model and in addition, not always the same material and diameters is welded and a good presentation, technology description, design, may or not may determine the best solutions. There are also exist advertising presentations related to welding.

Workpiece handles 
The type of chuck depends on the technology used, their construction sometimes may be similar to a lathe and milling machine.

Errors during welding 
 Components not in the same line of symmetry, non ideal interaction between the workpieces
problem with fixing items
 Incomplete welding
Bad parameters reducing properties of welded components

Safety during friction welding 
Before starting the work, even if the short and basic safety regulations should be knowned.
Compliance with occupational safety and health regulations
 Following the manufacturer's recommendations
 Set up the machine in a safe place: not blocking the entrance door, electric wires away from water, free movement of the users
 Recommended security systems for example: Emergency stop button, possibility of a quick stop of the machine
 Caution with hot and sharp things for example the hot welded components, chips if they are cut off on the welding machine
 Fresh air, for example do not smoke on the production hall near the machine.
 Covering moving components
The description of the security rules depends on the joining method and situation - access to fresh air, electrical ground, wearing protective clothing, protect the eyes is required.

Other techniques of friction welding 

 Forge welding
 Friction stir welding (FSW)
 Friction stir spot welding (FSSW)
 Linear friction welding (LFW)
 Research on friction welding of pipeline girth welds (FRIEX)
 Friction hydro pillar overlap processing (FHPPOW)
 Friction hydro pillar processing (FHHP)

Terms and definitions, name shortcuts 
Welding vs joining - Definitions depend on the author. Welding in Cambridge English dictionary means: "the activity of joining metal parts together" in Collins dictionary "the activity of uniting metal or plastic by softening with heat and hammering, or by fusion", which means that welding is related to connect. Join or joining has a similar meaning that welding and can mean the same in English dictionary means "to connect or fasten things together" but joining otherwise has many meanings for example "If roads or rivers join, they meet at a particular point". Joining opposed to welding, is a general term and there are several methods available for joining metals, including riveting, soldering, adhesive, brazing, coupling, fastening, press fit. Welding is only one type of joining process.

Solid-state weld - connect below the melting point,

welder - welding machine, but also mean a person who welds metal.

weld - the place of connection where the materials are mixed.

weldability  - a measure of the ease of making a weld without errors.

interlayer - an indirect component, indirect material.

To quote ISO (the International Organization for Standardization, unfortunately the all ISO text is not free and open shared) - ISO 15620:2019(en) Welding — Friction welding of metallic materials:

"axial force - force in axial direction between components to be welded,

burn-off length - loss of length during the friction phase,

burn-off rate - rate of shortening of the components during the friction welding process,

component - single item before welding,

component induced braking - reduction in rotational speed resulting from friction between the interfaces,

external braking - braking located externally reducing the rotational speed,

faying surface - surface of one component that is to be in contact with a surface of another component to form a joint,

forge force - force applied normal to the faying surfaces at the time when relative movement between the components is ceasing or has ceased,

forge burn-off length - amount by which the overall length of the components is reduced during the application of the forge force,

forge phase - interval time in the friction welding cycle between the start and finish of application of the forge force,

forge pressure - pressure (force per unit area) on the faying surfaces resulting from the axial forge force,

forge time - time for which the forge force is applied to the components,

friction force - force applied perpendicularly to the faying surfaces during the time that there is relative movement between the components,

friction phase - interval time in the friction welding cycle in which the heat necessary for making a weld is generated by relative motion and the friction forces between the components i.e. from contact of components to the start of deceleration,

friction pressure - pressure (force per unit area) on the faying surfaces resulting from the axial friction force,

friction time - time during which relative movement between the components takes place at rotational speed and under application of the friction forces,

interface - contact area developed between the faying surfaces after completion of the welding operation,

rotational speed - number of revolutions per minute of rotating component,

stick-out - distance a component sticks out from the fixture, or chuck in the direction of the mating component,

deceleration phase - interval in the friction welding cycle in which the relative motion of the components is decelerated to zero,

deceleration time - time required by the moving component to decelerate from friction speed to zero speed,

total length loss (upset) - loss of length that occurs as a result of friction welding, i.e. the sum of the burn-off length and the forge burn-off length,

total weld time - time elapsed between component contact and end of forging phase,

welding cycle - succession of operations carried out by the machine to make a weldment and return to the initial position, excluding component - handling operations,

weldment - two or more components joined by welding."

And more than that:

 RFW - Rotary friction welding,
 LFW - Linear friction welding,
 FSSW - Friction stir spot welding,
 FRIEX -  Research on friction welding of pipeline girth welds,
 FHPPOW - Friction hydro pillar overlap processing,
 FHHP - Friction hydro pillar processing,
 LFFW - Low Force Friction Welding,
 FSW - Friction stir welding,
 BM - Base material,
 HAZ - Heat affected zone,
 PAZ - Plastically affected zone,
 DRX - Dynamic recrystallization,
 TMAZ - Thermo-Mechanically Affected Zone,
 UFG - Ultra fine grain,
 SPD - Serve plastic deformation,
 HPT - High Pressure Torsion,
 FEM - Finite element method,
 SEM - Scanning electron microscopy,
 ADC - Analog to digital converter.

See also 
Welding
Friction
Friction welding
Friction stir welding
Temperature
Heat-affected zone
Dynamic recrystallization
Grain boundary strengthening
Severe plastic deformation

Curiosities 

 Frictional welding (μFSW) was also performed using a CNC machine. which does not mean that it is safe and recommended for the milling machine.
 Scientists even describe measurements of acoustic emissions during joining.

References

External links 

 Rotary Friction Welding at google scholar - scientific search engine also to many articles about rotary friction welding.
Rotary Friction Welding at TWI and search-results at TWI
Rotary Friction Welding at KUKA

Modifications Rotary friction welding 

 Low Force Friction Welding

Other techniques 

 Friction stir welding at TWI
 Friction-stir welding research at University of Cambridge

Simulation of the rotary welding process on YouTube 

 Rotary Friction Welding with movie 1, but the author did not select the rotation value; also mesh C3D10 is selected, but in Evaluation of Properties and FEM Model of the Friction Welded Mild Steel-Al6061-Alumina is written about mesh C3D8RT. No source files. Source requires verification. 
 Rotary Friction Welding with movie 2, but no source files and not fully understood so the source requires verification.

History of the rotary welding process in news paper (in Russian) 

 History the rotary welding process in news paper from 1958 (in Russian Техника - молодёжи 1958-02, страница 32, сварка трением)

Measuring system 

 Nice described measuring system: Development of a novel monitoring system for the in-process characterisation of the machine and tooling effects in Inertia Friction Welding (IFW)
 High Performance Thermal camera example link: According to data from and in 2022, example High Performance Flir thermal camera X8580 link and specification.  However it is not the only manufacturer, and high-performance devices are also generally expensive. Also, the parameters of the thermal camera not match to the classical not thermal cameras, for example 1280 × 1024 it is only ~1,3 MPx and nowadays cell phone cameras can have this value several times higher.

Scientific movie about the rotary friction welding 

 NMIS-AFRC with Rolls-Royce on the rotary friction revolution often scientific knowledge is available through universities, books, libraries, journals, but in this link is explained through the movie.

Welding